Chirikure Chirikure (born 1962), is a Zimbabwean poet, songwriter, and writer. He is a graduate of the University of Zimbabwe and an Honorary Fellow of University of Iowa, US. He worked with one of Zimbabwe's leading publishing houses as an editor/publisher for 17 years, until 2002. He now runs a literary agency and also works as a performance poet, cultural consultant and translator.

Literary career 
He has contributed some pieces in a Shona poetry anthology, Zviri Muchinokoro (2005, ZPH Publishers).

He has written and translated a number of children's stories and published some educational textbooks, and has also been an occasional contributor to the print media and ran a radio programme for young Shona writers.
Chirikure performs his poetry solo and/or with his mbira music ensemble. He has recorded an album of poetry and music, Napukeni (2002), with his colleagues, DeteMbira Group. He has also written lyrics for a number of leading Zimbabwean musicians and he occasionally performs with some of these musicians.

Prizes 

All of Chirikure's poetry books received first prizes in the annual Zimbabwe writer of the year awards. His first volume, Rukuvhute, also received an Honorable Mention in the Noma Award for Publishing in Africa, in 1990.

His other book, Hakurarwi – We Shall not Sleep, was selected as one of the 75 Best Zimbabwean Books of the 20th Century in a competition run by the Zimbabwe International Book Fair in 2004. In that competition the same book got a prize as one of the best five Shona publications of the 20th century.
Chirikure has participated in several local and international festivals and symposia over the years. He is married and has three children.

Bibliography
Rukuvhute (poetry in Shona) (1989), Harare: College Press
Chamupupuri (poetry in Shona) (1994), Harare: College Press
Hakurarwi – We Shall not Sleep (poetry in Shona, with English translations) (1994), Baobab Books
Mavende aKiti (children's stories) (1989), Harare: College Press
Zimbabwe Junior Certificate Shona Revision (1989), Harare: College Press
Grade Seven Shona Revision (co-author), (1989), Harare: College Press
Zviri Muchinokoro (co-author; poetry anthology), (2004), Harare: ZPH Publishers
Aussicht auf eigene Schatten (poetry in Shona and English, with German translations) (2011), Heidelberg, Germany: Verlag Das Wunderhorn

Discography/audio recordings
Napukeni (album of mbira music and poetry) (2002), Tuku Music/ZMC, Harare
Ray of Hope (Compilation album of AIDS awareness music), Rooftop Promotions, Harare
Chisina Basa (album recorded in 2012), Rooftop Promotions, Harare

References

External links
 Chirikure Chirikure at Lyrikline.org, with audio of the author reading, Shona text, and translation.

1962 births
Living people
Zimbabwean poets
Zimbabwean male writers
Male poets
Zimbabwean musicians
Alumni of Bernard Mizeki College
University of Zimbabwe alumni
International Writing Program alumni